Tetrachroa is a genus of moths in the family Sphingidae, containing only one species, Tetrachroa edwardsi, which is known from Queensland and New South Wales.

References

External links

Sphingulini
Monotypic moth genera
Taxa named by Walter Rothschild
Taxa named by Karl Jordan
Moths of Australia